The Cascades ecoregion is a Level III ecoregion designated by the United States Environmental Protection Agency (EPA) in the U.S. states of Washington, Oregon, and California. Somewhat smaller than the Cascade mountain range for which it is named, the ecoregion extends north to Snoqualmie Pass, near Seattle, and south to Hayden Pass, near the Oregon-California border, including the peaks and western slopes of most of the High Cascades. A discontiguous section is located on Mount Shasta in California.

The mountainous region is underlain by Cenozoic volcanic rock that has been affected by alpine glaciations. The western Cascades are older, lower, and dissected by numerous, steep-sided stream valleys. The region has a moist, temperate climate, which supports an extensive and highly productive coniferous forest that is intensively managed for logging, as well as recreational use. Subalpine meadows occur at higher elevations.

Much of the region consists of public lands managed by the federal government, including the Mount Baker-Snoqualmie, Wenatchee, Gifford Pinchot, Mount Hood, Columbia River Gorge National Scenic Area, Willamette, Umpqua, and Rogue River National Forests; the Clearwater, Norse Peak, Tatoosh, William O. Douglas, Goat Rocks, Mount Adams, Indian Heaven, Trapper Creek, Salmon–Huckleberry, Mount Hood, Table Rock, Bull of the Woods, Opal Creek, Middle Santiam, Menagerie, Mount Jefferson, Mount Washington, Three Sisters, Diamond Peak, Boulder Creek, Mount Thielsen, Rogue–Umpqua Divide, Sky Lakes, and Mountain Lakes Wilderness Areas; Mount Rainier and Crater Lake National Parks; and the Mount St. Helens National Volcanic Monument.

The Cascades is bordered on the north by the North Cascades ecoregion, on the south by the Klamath Mountains ecoregion, on the east by the Eastern Cascades Slopes and Foothills, and on the west by the Willamette Valley and Puget Lowland ecoregions. It been subdivided into six Level IV ecoregions in Washington and Oregon, as described below. Level IV mapping is not yet complete in California.

Animals include black bears, deer, elk, bobcats, cougars, coyotes, skunks, raccoons, and chipmunks.

Level IV ecoregions

Western Cascades Lowlands and Valleys (4a)
The Western Cascades Lowlands and Valleys ecoregion comprises a network of steep ridges and narrow valleys on the lower slopes of the Cascade Mountains. Its mild, wet climate promotes lush forests dominated by western hemlock and Douglas-fir, with western redcedar, bigleaf maple, red alder, vine maple, salal, rhododendron, Oregon grape, huckleberry, thimbleberry, swordfern, oxalis, hazel, and blackberry. Soils are warmer here than in higher elevation ecoregions, and it is one of the most important timber producing areas in the Pacific Northwest. The steep valleys trending to the west contain high and medium gradient rivers and streams that support cold water salmonids, including the threatened Chinook salmon, steelhead, and bull trout. Notable river drainages in Oregon include the North Umpqua, North and Middle Forks of the Willamette, McKenzie, North Santiam, South Santiam, Clackamas, Salmon and Bull Run River watersheds; and in Washington, the Lewis, Cowlitz, Nisqually, Puyallup, White, and Green River watersheds. Reservoirs store winter snowmelt for irrigation and municipal water supply in the Willamette Valley.

Western Cascades Montane Highlands (4b)
The Western Cascades Montane Highlands ecoregion is characterized by steeply sloping, dissected mountains with high to medium gradient streams and glacial rock-basin lakes. The western Cascades are older and more eroded than the lava plateau and prominent snow-covered cones of the High Cascades to the east. They are underlain by dark basalt in contrast to the gray andesite of the High Cascades. The region has lower temperatures and receives more winter snow than the lowlands and valleys to the west. Soils have a frigid or cryic temperature regimes. Abundant precipitation supports forests dominated by Douglas-fir and western hemlock, with mountain hemlock, noble fir, subalpine fir, grand fir, Pacific silver fir, red alder, and Pacific yew, and an understory of vine maple, rhododendron, Oregon grape, huckleberry, and thimbleberry. Today, the region is heavily managed for logging and recreation, and it is an important water source for lower elevation urban, suburban, and agricultural areas.

Cascade Crest Montane Forest (4c)
Volcanism in the Pliocene epoch overtopped the existing Miocene volcanics of the Western Cascades Montane Highlands. Later, Pleistocene glaciation left numerous rock-basin lakes throughout the plateau. Sinuous, medium gradient streams cross the subdued, glaciated terrain. The region is extensively forested with mountain hemlock, Pacific silver fir, and subalpine fir, with some grand fir, noble fir, Douglas-fir, Engelmann spruce, and lodgepole pine, and an understory of vine maple, huckleberry, rhododendron, beargrass, twinflower, and wintergreen. Mountain meadows support sedges, dwarf willows, and tufted hairgrass.

Cascades Subalpine/Alpine (4d)
The Cascades Subalpine/Alpine ecoregion is an area of high, glaciated, volcanic peaks rising above subalpine meadows, with cascading streams, glacial cirques, and tarns. Pleistocene glaciation reshaped the mountains above , leaving moraines, glacial lakes, and U-shaped glacial canyons. Glaciers and permanent snowfields still occur on the highest peaks, decreasing from north to south. The vegetation is adapted to high elevations, cold winter temperatures, a short growing season, and a deep winter snow pack. Herbaceous and shrubby subalpine meadow vegetation and scattered patches of mountain hemlock, subalpine fir, and whitebark pine occur near the timberline. Wet meadows support Brewer's sedge, Holm's sedge, black alpine sedge, tufted hairgrass, and alpine aster. Elsewhere, there is bare rock.

High Southern Cascades Montane Forest (4e)
The High Southern Cascades Montane Forest ecoregion is an undulating, glaciated, volcanic plateau punctuated by isolated
buttes and cones. Many tarns occur. Cryic soils support mixed coniferous forests dominated by mountain hemlock, lodgepole pine, and Pacific silver fir; they are colder than the mesic and frigid soils of the Southern Cascades. Grand fir, white fir, and Shasta red fir also occur and become more common toward the south and east. Whitebark pine is found at high elevations. Understory plants include woodrush, Prince's pine, lupine, and sidebells shinleaf. At the highest elevations, open meadows support Shasta buckwheat, Newberry knotweed, and Brewer's sedge. The region tends to be drier than the Cascade Crest Montane Forest, with a longer summer drought and more intermittent streams.

Southern Cascades (4f)
The Southern Cascades ecoregion is lower in elevation and less rugged than the surrounding regions and is characterized by gently sloping mountains and broad valleys. The climate is drier than other parts of the Cascades, and the vegetation reflects the long summer drought. River and stream discharge are also significantly lower than in systems to the north. Western hemlock and western red cedar, which are indicator species in the Western Cascades ecoregions, decline southward in the Southern Cascades, and are replaced by Sierra Nevada species such as California incense-cedar, white fir, Shasta red fir, and sugar pine, with an understory of snowberry, twinflower, Oregon grape, serviceberry, golden chinkapin, and oceanspray. At lower elevations, Douglas-fir and ponderosa pine are prevalent.

Gallery

Flora

Fauna

Landscapes

See also

Ecoregions defined by the EPA and the Commission for Environmental Cooperation:
List of ecoregions in North America (CEC)
List of ecoregions in the United States (EPA)
List of ecoregions in Oregon
List of ecoregions in Washington
List of ecoregions in California
The conservation group World Wildlife Fund maintains an alternate classification system:
List of ecoregions (WWF)
List of ecoregions in the United States (WWF)

References

External links

01
Temperate coniferous forests of the United States
Ecoregions of California
01
Forests of California
Forests of Oregon
Forests of Washington (state)
Montane forests
Pacific temperate rainforests
Ecoregions of Oregon
Regions of Washington (state)
Plant communities of the West Coast of the United States
Nearctic ecoregions